Raphitoma purpurea is a species of sea snail, a marine gastropod mollusk in the family Raphitomidae.

This species forms a complex with Raphitoma bourguignati (Locard, 1891), Raphitoma atropurpurea (Locard & Caziot, 1899), and Raphitoma digiulioi Pusateri & Giannuzzi Savelli, 2017.

Description
The length of the shell varies between 9 mm and 24 mm, its diameter between 4.9 mm and 9.5 mm.

(Original description) The species shows a very rugose, fusiform and robust shell. It has a of a dark purple colour with sometimes a few spots or blotches of white. It contains nine or ten whorls, rounded, and tapering to an extremely fine, sharp apex. They contain nineteen or twenty ribs, running a little oblique to the right. They are crossed by numerous sharp, elevated ridges, which rise into angles upon the ribs, making the shell very rough, and giving it a cancellated appearance. The aperture is narrow, oval and terminates into a strait siphonal canal. The outer lip is thin. The margin is white, crenated by the striae. The columella striated transversely oblique to the end of the siphonal canal, and somewhat tuberculated. Inside it is purple, marked by the ribs.

The whorls are usually well rounded, clathrate by narrow ribs and almost equally strong revolving ridges. The color of the shell is reddish or purplish brown, white-zoned below the middle of the body whorl, the zone distinct within the lip.

Distribution
This species occurs in the Mediterranean Sea and in the Atlantic Ocean from Northern Europa, the Azores, the Canary Islands to Angola. Fossils were found in Upper Pliocene strata in Italy.

References

 Nordsieck F. (1968). Die europäischen Meeres-Gehäuseschnecken (Prosobranchia). Vom Eismeer bis Kapverden und Mittelmeer. Gustav Fischer, Stuttgart VIII + 273 pp.
 Nordsieck F. (1977). The Turridae of the European seas. Roma: La Conchiglia. 131 pp.
 Høisæter T. (2016). A taxonomic review of the Norwegian species of Raphitoma (Gastropoda: Conoidea: Raphitomidae). Fauna Norvegica. 36: 9-32
 Pusateri F., Giannuzzi Savelli R., Bartolini S. & Oliverio M. (2017). A revision of the Mediterranean Raphitomidae (Neogastropoda, Conoidea) 4: The species of the group of Raphitoma purpurea (Montagu, 1803) with the description of a new species. Bollettino Malacologico. 53(2): 161-183
 Hayward, P.J.; Ryland, J.S. (Ed.). (1990). The marine fauna of the British Isles and North-West Europe: 1. Introduction and protozoans to arthropods. Clarendon Press: Oxford, UK. . 627 pp
 Rolán E., 2005. Malacological Fauna From The Cape Verde Archipelago. Part 1, Polyplacophora and Gastropoda.

External links
 Forbes E. (1844). Report on the Mollusca and Radiata of the Aegean sea, and on their distribution, considered as bearing on geology. Reports of the British Association for the Advancement of Science for 1843. 130-193
 Bellardi L. (1877), I molluschi dei terreni terziarii del Piemonte e della Liguria /
 MNHN, Paris: specimen
 
 Gastropods.com: Raphitoma purpurea purpurea
 Natural History Museum, Rotterdam: Raphitoma purpurea

purpurea
Gastropods described in 1803